Coriander (Coriandrum sativum) is an annual herb in the family Apiaceae. It is also known as dhania or cilantro. All parts of the plant are edible, but the fresh leaves and the dried seeds (which are both a herb and a spice) are the parts most traditionally used in cooking.

Most people perceive coriander as having a tart, lemon/lime taste, but to nearly a quarter of those surveyed, the leaves taste like dish soap, linked to a gene that detects some specific aldehydes that can produce soapy sensation from the odorant substances.

Botanical description 

Coriander is native to regions spanning from Southern Europe and Northern Africa to Southwestern Asia.

The leaves are variable in shape, broadly lobed at the base of the plant, and slender and feathery higher on the flowering stems.

The fruit is a globular, dry schizocarp  in diameter.

Etymology 

 is the Spanish word for coriander, also deriving from coriandrum. It is the common term in American English for coriander leaves due to their extensive use in Mexican cuisine.

Origin and history 
Coriander grows wild over a wide area of Western Asia and Southern Europe, prompting the comment: "It is hard to define exactly where this plant is wild and where it only recently established itself." Recent works suggested that coriander accessions found in the wild in Israel and Portugal might represent the ancestor of the cultivated coriander. They have low germination rates and a small vegetative appearance. The accession found in Israel has an extremely hard fruit coat.

Fifteen desiccated mericarps were found in the Pre-Pottery Neolithic B level (six to eight thousand years ago) of the Nahal Hemar Cave, published in Kislev 1988, and eleven from ~8,000–7,500 years ago in Pre-Pottery Neolithic C in Atlit-Yam, published as Kislev et al. 2004, both in Israel. If these finds do belong to these archaeological layers, they are the oldest find of coriander in the world.

About  of coriander mericarps were recovered from the tomb of Tutankhamen, and because this plant does not grow wild in Egypt, Zohary and Hopf interpret this find as proof that coriander was cultivated by the ancient Egyptians.

The Ebers Papyrus, an Egyptian text dated around 1550 BC, mentioned uses of coriander.

Coriander seems to have been cultivated in Greece since at least the second millennium BC. One of the Linear B tablets recovered from Pylos refers to the species as being cultivated for the manufacture of perfumes; it was used in two forms – as a spice for its seeds and as an herb for the flavour of its leaves.

This appears to be confirmed by archaeological evidence from the same period; the large quantities of the species retrieved from an Early Bronze Age layer at Sitagroi in Macedonia could point to cultivation of the species at that time.

Later, coriander was mentioned by Hippocrates (around 400 BC), as well as Dioscorides (65 AD).

Uses 

Fresh leaves and dried seeds are the most commonly used in cooking, but all parts of the plant are edible, and the roots are an important element of Thai cooking. Coriander is used in cuisines throughout the world.

Leaves 

The leaves are variously referred to as coriander leaves, fresh coriander, Chinese parsley, or (in the US and commercially in Canada) cilantro. The fresh leaves are an ingredient in many foods, such as chutneys and salads, salsa, guacamole, and as a widely used garnish for soup, fish, and meat. As heat diminishes their flavour, coriander leaves are often used raw or added to the dish immediately before serving. In Indian and Central Asian recipes, coriander leaves are used in large amounts and cooked until the flavour diminishes. The leaves spoil quickly when removed from the plant and lose their aroma when dried or frozen.

The taste of the leaves and the seeds are distinct. The seeds exhibit citrus overtones. The dominant flavorants in the leaves are the aldehydes 2-decenal and 2-dodecenal. The main flavorant in the seeds is (+)-linalool.

Seeds 

The dry fruits are coriander seeds. The word "coriander" in food preparation may refer solely to these seeds (as a spice), rather than the plant. The seeds have a lemony citrus flavour when crushed due to terpenes linalool and pinene. It is described as warm, nutty, spicy, and orange-flavoured.

Large-fruited types are grown mainly by tropical and subtropical countries, e.g. Morocco, India, and Australia, and contain a low volatile oil content (0.1–0.4%). They are used extensively for grinding and blending purposes in the spice trade. Types with smaller fruit are produced in temperate regions and usually have a volatile oil content of around 0.4–1.8%, so they are highly valued as a raw material for the preparation of essential oil.

Coriander is commonly found both as whole dried seeds and in ground form. Roasting or heating the seeds in a dry pan heightens the flavour, aroma, and pungency. Ground coriander seed loses flavour quickly in storage and is best ground fresh. Coriander seed is a spice in garam masala, and Indian curries, which often employ the ground fruits in generous amounts together with cumin, acting as a thickener in a mixture called dhania jeera. Roasted coriander seeds, called dhania dal, are eaten as a snack.

Outside of Asia, coriander seed is used widely for pickling vegetables. In Germany and South Africa (see boerewors), the seeds are used while making sausages. In Russia and Central Europe, coriander seed is an occasional ingredient in rye bread (e.g. Borodinsky bread) as an alternative to caraway. The Zuni people of North America have adapted it into their cuisine, mixing the powdered seeds ground with chilli, using it as a condiment with meat, and eating leaves as a salad.

Coriander seeds are used in brewing certain styles of beer, particularly some Belgian wheat beers. The coriander seeds are used with orange peel to add a citrus character.

Coriander seeds are one of the key botanicals used to flavour gin.

One preliminary study showed coriander essential oil to inhibit Gram-positive and Gram-negative bacteria, including Staphylococcus aureus, Enterococcus faecalis, Pseudomonas aeruginosa, and Escherichia coli.

Coriander is listed as one of the original ingredients in the secret formula for Coca-Cola.

Roots 

Coriander roots have a deeper, more intense flavour than the leaves and are used in a variety of Asian cuisines, especially in Thai dishes such as soups or curry pastes.

Nutrition 

Raw coriander leaves are 92% water, 4% carbohydrates, 2% protein, and less than 1% fat (table). The nutritional profile of coriander seeds is different from that of fresh stems or leaves. In a  reference amount, leaves are particularly rich in vitamin A, vitamin C, and vitamin K, with moderate content of dietary minerals (table). Although seeds generally have lower vitamin content, they do provide significant amounts of dietary fiber, calcium, selenium, iron, magnesium, and manganese.

Taste and smell 
The essential oil from coriander leaves and seeds contains mixed polyphenols and terpenes, including linalool as the major constituent accounting for the aroma and flavour of coriander.

Different people may perceive the taste of coriander leaves differently. Those who enjoy it say it has a refreshing, lemony or lime-like flavour, while those who dislike it have a strong aversion to its pungent taste and smell, characterizing it as soapy or rotten. Studies also show variations in preference among different ethnic groups: 21% of East Asians, 17% of Caucasians, and 14% of people of African descent expressed a dislike for coriander, but among the groups where coriander is popular in their cuisine, only 7% of South Asians, 4% of Hispanics, and 3% of Middle Eastern subjects expressed a dislike.

About 80% of identical twins shared the same preference for the herb, but fraternal twins agreed only about half the time, strongly suggesting a genetic component to the preference. In a genetic survey of nearly 30,000 people, two genetic variants linked to the perception of coriander have been found, the most common of which is a gene involved in sensing smells. The gene OR6A2 lies within a cluster of olfactory-receptor genes, and encodes a receptor that is highly sensitive to aldehyde chemicals. Flavour chemists have found that the coriander aroma is created by a half-dozen substances, most of which are aldehydes. Those who dislike the taste are sensitive to the offending unsaturated aldehydes and, at the same time, may be unable to detect the aromatic chemicals that others find pleasant. Association between its taste and several other genes, including a bitter-taste receptor, have also been found.

Allergy 
Some people are allergic to coriander leaves or seeds, having symptoms similar to those of other food allergies. In one study examining people suspected of food allergies to spices, 32% of pin-prick tests in children and 23% in adults were positive for coriander and other members of the family Apiaceae, including caraway, fennel, and celery. The allergic symptoms may be minor or life-threatening.

Similar plants 
Other herbs are used where they grow in much the same way as coriander leaves.
 Eryngium foetidum has a similar, but more intense, taste. Known as culantro and as Ngo Gai, it is found in Mexico, South America, the Caribbean, and South East Asia.
 Persicaria odorata is commonly called Vietnamese coriander, or rau răm. The leaves have a similar odour and flavour to coriander. It is a member of the Polygonaceae, or buckwheat family.
 Papaloquelite is one common name for Porophyllum ruderale subsp. macrocephalum, a member of the Asteraceae, the sunflower family. This species is found growing wild from Texas to Argentina.

References

External links 
 

Edible Apiaceae
Herbs
Indian spices
Medicinal plants
Plants described in 1753
Plants used in Native American cuisine
Spices
Apioideae